Kenneth Township is a township in Sheridan County, Kansas, United States. As of the 2010 Census, it had a population of 1,350. Hoxie, the county seat of Sheridan County, is located in Kenneth Township.

References

Townships in Sheridan County, Kansas
Townships in Kansas